Dodone can refer to
 An alternate spelling of the ancient city of Dodona, in Epiris in northwestern Greece, where the oldest oracle of Zeus was located.
 Dodone (mythology), an Oceanid nymph in Greek mythology, said to be the eponym of the ancient city of Dodona

See also 
 Dodon (disambiguation)
 Dodona (disambiguation)